is a Japanese footballer currently playing as a striker for Kashiwa Reysol.

Career statistics

Club
.

Notes

References

2003 births
Living people
Association football people from Chiba Prefecture
Japanese footballers
Association football forwards
Kashiwa Reysol players